Appetite for Destruction is a 1987 album by Guns N' Roses.

Appetite for Destruction may also refer to:
Appetite for Destruction (Ruby Isle album) (2010)
"Appetite for Destruction" (song), a 1991 song by N.W.A.
Appetite for Destruction, a painting by Robert Williams
Appetite for Destruction, a professional wrestling tag team consisting of Kevin Steen and Super Dragon
"Appetite for Destruction", an episode of The Loud House

See also
Appetite for Disctruction, a 2000 album by Funkstörung